Frédéric Laurent (born 21 November 1975 in Paris, France), is a French/French Guianese former football midfielder.

He previously played for French clubs including Tours FC, SO Romorantin and  Dijon FCO.

External links

French footballers
Tours FC players
Dijon FCO players
Chamois Niortais F.C. players
Stade Lavallois players
FC Martigues players
Ligue 2 players
1975 births
Living people
FC Metz players
SO Romorantin players
Association football midfielders